Saint Bobo of Provence ( or Bobon,  or Bobone; died 986) was a Frankish warrior and pilgrim from Noyers (Noghiers). He is known only from the anonymous biography Vita sancti Bobonis. He built a castle on a hill opposite the Muslim fortress of Fraxinet and led the Christians of Provence to victory in battle with the Muslims in an unknown year. During the battle he had a mystical experience and vowed, if victorious, to renounce war and become a pilgrim devoted to the care of orphans and widows. After the loss of his brother, he went on pilgrimage to Rome and died at Voghera in Lombardy.

Bobo is venerated as a saint in the Eastern Orthodox and Roman Catholic churches. His feast day is May 22 and he is the patron saint of cattle.

Notes

Sources

Further reading

986 deaths
Medieval French knights
Frankish warriors
Saints of West Francia
People from Provence
Year of birth unknown
10th-century Christian saints
10th-century people from West Francia